Cottle is a surname.  According to Cottle, this surname is a Cornish toponym referring to a 'wood (by the) estuary' with some association with the River Tamar in Cornwall.

Notable people sharing this surname include:

Amos Simon Cottle (1766–1800), British poet
Annette Cottle (living), American volleyball player and coach
Barry Cottle (living), American businessman, CEO of Scientific Games Corporation
Basil Cottle (1917–1994), British grammarian, historian and archaeologist
Brian Cottle (living), lawyer and judge from Saint Vincent and the Grenadines
Christopher Cottle (living), American lawyer and jurist
Darby Cottle (living), American softball player
Dave Cottle (living), American lacrosse coach
Frank Cottle (1920–1992), Australian rugby league footballer
George Washington Cottle (1811–1836), Republic of Texas soldier
Gerry Cottle (1945–2021), circus owner
Gitta Cottle, alternative name for Gertrude Weinstock (1904–1985), American pianist
Joe Cottle, (1886–1958), English footballer
John Cottle (living), New Zealand equestrian
Joseph Cottle (1770–1853), English publisher and author
Josephine Owaissa Cottle, alternative name for Gale Storm (1922–2009), American actress, singer
Laurence Cottle (living), British composer and musician
Marjorie Cottle (1900–1987), British motorcycle racer
Matthew Cottle (living), British actor
Nancy Cottle, listed as chairperson for Arizona on false slate of Trump electors
Richard W. Cottle (living), American mathematician
Robert Cottle (1920–1999) was an American television host
Sibella Cottle (deceased), mistress to Irish noble
Sidney Cottle (1892–1967), British flying ace
Simon Cottle (rower) (living), British rower
Steven Cottle (living), New Zealand rower
Tameka Cottle (living), American singer-songwriter
Thomas Cottle (1761–1828), lawyer
Travis Allen Cottle (living), American Christian Singer-Songwriter

Fictional characters:
Sherman Cottle

References